Barbara mappana is a species of moth in the family Tortricidae. It has been reported on cones of white spruce, but is also considered to be of minor importance compared to other insect species which consume and potentially damage white spruce.

References 

Olethreutinae
Moths described in 1941